Eosinophiluria is the abnormal presence of eosinophils in the urine. It can be measured by detecting levels of eosinophil cationic protein.

Associated conditions
It can be associated with a wide variety of conditions, including:
 Kidney disorders such as acute interstitial nephritis and acute kidney injury from cholesterol embolism
 Urinary tract infection 
 Eosinophilic granulomatosis with polyangiitis

Eosinophiluria (>5% of urine leukocytes ) is a common finding (~90%) in antibiotic induced allergic nephritis, however lymphocytes predominate in allergic interstitial nephritis induced by NSAIDs. Eosinophiluria is a feature of atheroembolic ARF.

In PAN, microscopic polyangitis, eosinophiluria is rare.

References

External links
 Clinical correlates of eosinophiluria

Abnormal clinical and laboratory findings for urine